The Asterinaceae are a family of fungi in the monotypic class Asterinales.

Genera
This is a list of the genera in the Asterinaceae, based on a 2021 review and summary of fungal classification by Wijayawardene and colleagues. Following the genus name is the taxonomic authority (those who first circumscribed the genus; standardized author abbreviations are used), year of publication, and the number of species:
Asterina  – ca. 1085 spp.

Asterolibertia  – ca. 30 spp.
Asterostomella  – 87 spp.
Batistinula  – 1 sp.
Cirsosia  – 18 spp.
Dothidasteromella  – 11 spp.
Echidnodella  – 35 spp.
Echidnodes  – 27 spp.
Halbania  – 3 spp.
Meliolaster  – 3 spp.
Morenoina  - 26 spp.
Parasterinopsis  – 3 spp.
Platypeltella  – 3 spp.
Prillieuxina  – 66 spp.
Schenckiella  – 1 sp.
Steyaertia  - 1sp.
Trichasterina  – 11 spp.

Uleothyrium  – 3 spp.
Vizellopsis  – 1 sp.

References

 
Dothideomycetes families
Taxa described in 1946